Dagnis Vinogradovs (born 2 June 1981) is a Latvian sprint canoer who competed in the mid-2000s. At the 2004 Summer Olympics in Athens, he finished seventh in the C-1 1000 m event while being eliminated in the semifinals of the C-1 500 m event.

References

External links
 
 

1981 births
Canoeists at the 2004 Summer Olympics
Latvian male canoeists
Living people
Olympic canoeists of Latvia